James Dunlavy (February 4, 1844 – March 6, 1923) was an American soldier who fought for the Union Army in the American Civil War. Dunlavy received the Medal of Honor for capturing Confederate Major General John Sappington Marmaduke at the Battle of Mine Creek on October 25, 1864.

Biography 
Dunlavy was born the first of two children in Decatur County, Indiana, on February 4, 1844, to Harvey Howard Dunlavy (1817–1875) and Martha Ann Armour Rose Dunlavy (1822–1878).

He joined the 3rd Iowa Cavalry Regiment in November 1863. Though he still had eight months to serve when he captured Confederate Major General John S. Marmaduke on October 25, 1864, he was given a furlough as a reward for the remainder of his service commitment. He received his Medal of Honor on April 4, 1865. He was mustered out with his regiment in August 1865. After the Civil War, he became a doctor.

Dunlavy died on March 6, 1923; his remains are interred at the Independent Order of Odd Fellows Cemetery in Maramec, Oklahoma.

Medal of Honor citation

See also 
 List of American Civil War Medal of Honor recipients: A–F

References 

1844 births
1923 deaths
American Civil War recipients of the Medal of Honor
People of Iowa in the American Civil War
Union Army soldiers
United States Army Medal of Honor recipients